Q'illu Pachaka (Quechua q'illu yellow, Hispanicized spelling Jellopachaca) is a mountain in the Wansu mountain range in the Andes of Peru, about  high. It is situated in the Apurímac Region, Antabamba Province, Oropesa District. Q'illu Pachaka lies east of Wank'ayuq Saywa and southeast of Hatun Qillqa.

References 

Mountains of Peru
Mountains of Apurímac Region